The 1943 College Football All-America team is composed of college football players who were selected as All-Americans by various organizations and writers that chose College Football All-America Teams in 1943. The eight selectors recognized by the NCAA as "official" for the 1943 season are (1) Collier's Weekly, as selected by Grantland Rice, (2) the Associated Press, (3) the United Press, (4) the All-America Board, (5) Football News, (6) the International News Service (INS), (7) Look magazine, and (8) the Sporting News.

Consensus All-Americans
For the year 1943, the NCAA recognizes eight published All-American teams as "official" designations for purposes of its consensus determinations. The following chart identifies the NCAA-recognized consensus All-Americans and displays which first-team designations they received.

All-American selections for 1943

Ends
 Ralph Heywood, USC (AAB; AP-1; FN; INS-1; LK; UP-1; CP-1; SS-1)
 John Yonakor, Notre Dame (AAB; UP-1; INS-1; SN; CP-1)
 Pete Pihos, Indiana (College and Pro Football Hall of Fame) (AAB; AP-3; SN; UP-2; CO-1; NYS-1)
 Albert Channell, Navy (AP-3; FN; LK)
 John Monahan, Dartmouth (AP-2; NYS-1)
 Roe Johnston, Navy (SS-1)
 Herb Hein, Northwestern (CO-1)
 Joe Parker, Texas (AP-1)
 Robert Hall, Colorado College (AP-2)
 Robert Gantt, Duke (UP-2)

Tackles
 Don Whitmire, Navy (College Football Hall of Fame) (AAB; INS-1; LK; UP-1; CP-1)
 Jim White, Notre Dame (AAB; AP-1; CO-1; INS-1; SN; UP-1; CP-1)
 Merv Pregulman, Michigan (AP-3; CO-1 [g]; FN; LK; SN; UP-2; SS-1)
 Art McCaffray, College of the Pacific (UP-2; CO-1; NYS-1)
 George Connor, Holy Cross (AP-2; NYS-1)
 Cleo Calgani, Cornell (SS-1)
 Pat Preston, Duke (AP-1)
 Francis Merritt, Army (College Football Hall of Fame) (AP-2; FN)
 Solon Burnett, Southwestern (Texas) (AP-3)

Guards
 Alex Agase, Purdue (College Football Hall of Fame) (AAB; AP-3; FN; INS-1; LK; SN; UP-1; CP-1)
 Pat Filley, Notre Dame (AP-2; CO-1; FN; SN; UP-1)
 John Steber, Georgia Tech. (AAB; AP-1 [tackle]; UP-2; INS-1; NYS-1)
 Bill Milner, Duke (SS-1; CP-1)
 Harold Fisher, Southwestern (LK)
 Bill Milner, Duke (NYS-1)
 Don Alvarez, Dartmouth (SS-1)
 George Brown, Navy (AP-1)
 John Jaffurs, Penn State (AP-2; UP-2)
 Richard Ward, Washington (AP-3)

Centers
 Cas Myslinski, Army (AAB; AP-1; CO-1; FN; INS-1; LK; SN; UP-1; CP-1; SS-1)
 Jack Martin, Navy (NYS-1)
 Bill Gray, USC (AP-2)
 Herbert Coleman, Notre Dame (UP-2)
 Lester Gatewood, Tulane (AP-3)

Quarterbacks
 Angelo Bertelli, Notre Dame (College Football Hall of Fame) (AAB; AP-2; CO-1; FN; INS-1; LK; SN; UP-1; CP-1; NYS-1; SS-1)
 Otto Graham, Northwestern (AAB [hb]; AP-1; FN; UP-2; CP-1)

Halfbacks
 Bill Daley, Michigan (AAB [fb]; AP-1; CO-1 [fb]; FN; INS-1; LK; SN; UP-1; CP-1; NYS-1; SS-1)
 Bob Odell, Penn (College Football Hall of Fame) (AP-1; UP-2; CO-1; INS-1; LK; NYS-1)
 Creighton Miller, Notre Dame (College Football Hall of Fame) (AAB; AP-1; CO-1; FN; INS-1; SN; UP-1)
 Eddie Prokop, Georgia Tech (AP-2; UP-2)
 Alvin Dark, Southwestern Louisiana (AP-2)
 Harold Hamburg, Navy (UP-2)
 Steve Van Buren, LSU (AP-3)
 Robert Hoernschemeyer, Indiana (AP-3)
 Bob Steuber, DePauw (AP-3)

Fullbacks
 John Podesto, College of the Pacific (AP-3; LK; SS-1 [halfback]; NYS-1)
 Tony Butkovich, Purdue (killed on Okinawa, World War II) (AP-2; SN; UP-1; CP-1; SS-1)

Key
Bold = Consensus All-American
 -1 – First-team selection
 -2 – Second-team selection
 -3 – Third-team selection

Official selectors
 AAB = All-America Board
 AP = Associated Press
 CO = Collier's Weekly, selected by Grantland Rice
 FN = Football News
 INS = International News Service
 LK = NBC radio and Look magazine, selected under the supervision of Bill Stern, by 138 sports announcers and 25 key sports writers
 SN = Sporting News, selected through a poll of 86 sports writers in 40 states
 UP = United Press

Other selectors
 CP = Central Press Association, selected with the assistance of the nation's football captains
 MS = Maxwell Stiles, noted California sports writer, based on the number of weeks a player was named player of the week at his position
 NYS = New York Sun
 SS = Stars and Stripes, selected by the sports writers for the Army publication
 WC = Walter Camp Football Foundation

See also
 1943 All-Big Six Conference football team
 1943 All-Big Ten Conference football team
 1943 All-Pacific Coast Conference football team
 1943 All-SEC football team

References

All-America Team
College Football All-America Teams